Louisa Lane Clarke (1812 – 8 November 1883) was a British botanist and travel writer, best known for her microscopy work on plants.

Biography
Louisa Lane was born in 1812 in the Channel Islands, the eldest daughter of Major-General Ambrose Lane and Elizabeth Lane, née Le Mesurier. On 14 September 1841, Lane married the Revd. Thomas Clarke ( – 1864), Rector of Woodeaton, Oxfordshire. They then relocated to East Bergholt, Suffolk.

Clarke wrote numerous travel guides. She is best known for her later botanical work popularizing microscopy.

Her husband died in 1864 and she relocated to Guernsey with her daughter, Theodora, by the following year. Clarke died in L'Hyvreuse, Saint Peter Port, Guernsey.

Selected works

Travel guides
 Recollections and Legends of Serk
 Redstone's Guernsey Guide
 The Country Parson's Wife
 The New Parish Church of St. Ann (1850)
 The Island of Alderney

Scientific works
 The Microscope: Being a Popular Description of the Most Instructive and Beautiful Subjects for Exhibition was published in successive editions into the 1880s.
 The Common Seaweeds of the British Coast and Channel Islands; with Some Insight into the Microscopic Beauties of Their Structure and Fructification

References

1812 births
1883 deaths
Writers from the Channel Islands
People from East Bergholt
English botanical writers
English botanists
Women botanists
British women travel writers
English travel writers
Place of death missing
Date of birth missing
19th-century English women writers